Aage Ingvar Eriksen (5 May 1917 in Notodden  17 June 1998 in Notodden, Telemark) was a Norwegian wrestler and Olympic medalist in Greco-Roman wrestling.

Olympics
Eriksen competed at the 1948 Summer Olympics in London where he received a silver medal in Greco-Roman wrestling, the lightweight class.

National champion
10 times (Greco-Roman), between years 1937-55.
2 times (freestyle wrestling),  between years 1937-55.

He represented the club SK Snøgg.

References

External links
Wrestling at the 1948 Summer Olympics

External links 
 
 
 

1917 births
1998 deaths
Olympic wrestlers of Norway
Wrestlers at the 1948 Summer Olympics
Wrestlers at the 1952 Summer Olympics
Norwegian male sport wrestlers
Olympic silver medalists for Norway
Olympic medalists in wrestling
Medalists at the 1948 Summer Olympics
People from Notodden
Sportspeople from Vestfold og Telemark
20th-century Norwegian people